Koanophyllon dolicholepis is a species of flowering plant in the family Asteraceae. It is found only in Puerto Rico.

References

dolicholepis
Endemic flora of Puerto Rico
Plants described in 1899
Flora without expected TNC conservation status